Project Runway All Stars (Season 5) is the fifth season of the Project Runway spin-off series Project Runway All Stars. It features 13 designers from previous seasons of the original series and Project Runway: Under the Gunn with Alyssa Milano returning as both host and judge. TV fashion correspondent and Marie Claire’s Senior Fashion Editor Zanna Roberts Rassi also returns to mentor contestants.

The prizes for this season are the opportunity to design an exclusive line of jewelry for BaubleBar.com, a capsule footwear collection by Chinese Laundry, a fashion spread in Marie Claire and a position at the magazine as Contributing Editor, a complete sewing studio to launch his/her winning line from Brothers Sewing and Embroidery and a cash prize of USD 100,000.

Designers
Names and locales per official site:

Models
Shyloh Wilkinson
Dominique Marene
Tierra Benton
Erin Mulcahy
Sara Bledsoe
Alea Saunders
Sara Gardner
Lyric Lincoln
Molly Fletcher
Hildie Gifstad
Keyshla Maisonet
Ashley Hart

Designer Progress 

 The designer won season five of Project Runway All Stars.
 The designer won the challenge.
 The designer came in second but did not win the challenge.
 The designer had one of the highest scores for the challenge but did not win.
 The designer had one of the lowest scores for the challenge but was not eliminated.
 The designer was in the bottom two but was not eliminated.
 The designer lost the challenge and was eliminated from the competition.

Model Elimination Table 

 The model wore the winning design of the winner of Project Runway All Stars.
 The model wore the 2nd place design of the runner-up of Project Runway All Stars.
 The model wore the 3rd place design of the 2nd runner-up of Project Runway All Stars.
 The model wore the winning design that challenge.
 The model wore the 2nd place design that challenge.
 The model wore the 3rd place design that challenge.
 The model wore the 3rd to worse design that challenge.
 The model wore the 2nd to worst design that challenge.
 The model wore the losing design that challenge.
 The model was eliminated.
In episode 5, the models were not needed in the challenge.

Designer Legend
Alexander Pope: AP
Asha Daniels: AD
Daniel Franco: DF
Dom Streater: DS
Emily Payne: EP
Fade Zu Grau: FG
Ken Laurence: KL
Kini Zamora: KZ
Layana Aguilar: LA
Mitchell Perry: MP
Sam Donovan: SD
Stella Zotis: SZ
Valerie Mayen: VM

Episodes

Episode 1: What Makes An All Star? 
Original airdate: 

The designers must tap into their past to create a look inspired by a moment that kick-started their fashion career.
 Guest Judge: Dmitry Sholokhov
 WINNER: Valerie
 ELIMINATED: None

Episode 2: Let it Flow 
Original airdate: 

A wind machine on the runway tasks the designers with creating dramatic, elegant looks that showcase the movement of the fabric.

 Guest Judge: Vanessa Hudgens
 WINNER: Sam
 ELIMINATED: Fäde

Episode 3: A Little Bit Country, A Little Bit Rock 'n' Roll 
Original airdate: 

The designers must team up with music group Little Big Town to create "opposites attract" red-carpet gowns for the Academy of Country Music Awards. The pairs are:

Sam/Kini, Asha/Alexander, Valerie/Stella, Emily/Layana, Dom/Ken, Daniel/Mitchell

 Guest Judge: Little Big Town
 WINNER: Alexander & Asha
 ELIMINATED: Daniel

Episode 4: Fashion 911 
Original airdate: 

The Unconventional Challenge finds the designers turning New York City emergency services materials into runway-worthy looks.

 Guest Judge: Johnny Wujek
 WINNER: Sam
 ELIMINATED: Stella

Episode 5: Birthday Suits
Original airdate: 

The designers must create winter wear to keep uninhibited naturists toasty warm on the naked runway.

Guest Judge: Song of Style and Naeem Khan
WINNER: Emily
ELIMINATED: None

Episode 6: Going for Baroque
Original airdate: 

The designers celebrate Baroque fashion by creating couture inspired gowns.

Guest Judge: Coco Rocha and Keren Craig
WINNER: Ken
ELIMINATED: Mitchell

Episode 7: Bait and Stitch
Original airdate: 

The All Stars are challenged to create evening resort wear from fabric preselected by another designer.

Guest Judge: Megan Hilty
WINNER: Dom
ELIMINATED: Valerie

Episode 8: Once Upon a Runway 
Original airdate: 

Laura Michelle Kelly, star of Broadway's Finding Neverland, challenges the designers to re-imagine looks for classic fairy-tale characters.
The characters are assigned thus:
Alexander: Cinderella; 
Asha: Rapunzel; 
Dom: Tinkerbell; 
Emily: The Snow Queen; 
Ken: Snow White; 
Kini: Alice (in Wonderland); 
Layana: Belle; 
Sam: The Little Mermaid.

 Guest Judge: Kesha and Brad Goreski
 WINNER: Asha
 ELIMINATED: Alexander

Episode 9: A Touch of Style 
Original airdate: 

The designers must combine sports and fashion to create high-end leisure wear inspired by the "Touch by Alyssa Milano" line.

 Guest Judge: Kristin Cavallari
 WINNER: Kini
 ELIMINATED: Layana

Episode 10: Rebel With A Cause 
Original airdate: 

Fashion designer Zac Posen and actress Debi Mazar join the judges to critique sophisticated summer looks with an edge.
 
 Guest judge: Debi Mazar and Zac Posen
 WINNER: Emily
 ELIMINATED: Asha

Episode 11: State of Art 
Original airdate: 

Tensions run high as the designers are pushed to the limit to create avant-garde fashion inspired by contemporary art.

 Guest judge: Boy George
 WINNER: Ken
 ELIMINATED: Emily

Episode 12: Prince of Prints 
Original airdate: 

Four surprise guests return to advise the designers as they create print-on-print looks for Nina Garcia: two designers battle to make the finale.

 Guest Judge: Nina García, Dmitry Sholokhov, Mondo Guerra, Seth Aaron Henderson, Anthony Ryan Auld
 WINNER: Dom
 ELIMINATED: Sam

Episode 13: New York State of Mind 
Original airdate: 

The designers are challenged to create collections that are inspired by New York: the winner is chosen.

 Guest judge: Debra Messing and Anne Fulenwider 
 WINNER: Dom
 ELIMINATED: Ken & Kini

References

External links 

All Stars Season 04
2016 American television seasons
2016 in fashion